Khorava is a Georgian surname. Notable people with the surname include:

 Akaki Khorava (1895–1972), Georgian actor
 Bachana Khorava (born 1993), Georgian athlete
 Miranda Khorava (born 1977), Georgian chess player

Georgian-language surnames